The Monastery of the Archangels Michael and Gabriel was founded and raised in 1312 in Jerusalem by King Milutin. It is located within the walls of the Old City of Jerusalem (Holy Land), near the Church of the Holy Sepulcher (Church of the Resurrection of Christ) and the Greek Patriarchate.

History of the monastery
On the foundations of the ruins of the old Byzantine monastery, which was there from the 4th to the 9th century, King Milutin built this monastery for the needs of Serbian monks in Jerusalem as part of the Byzantine victory over the Persians. The construction of this monastery is closely related to a historical event about which very little is known today. It was built after the brilliant victory of the Serbian army in Asia Minor. Milutin's chronicler, Archbishop Danilo, wrote about that event. He writes in his chronicle that King Milutin sent elite warriors to his father-in-law, the Byzantine emperor Andronicus II Palaeologus, to help fight the Ottoman Turks, under the leadership of Duke Novak Grebostrek, who successfully defeated them. Archbishop Danilo wrote: "Serbs cut their bodies like a reed." After this victory, King Milutin built the church of the Holy Archangels, and then he built lodgings, a small hospital, and an inn for all Serbian and Slavic monks and worshipers in the Holy Land. As stated in the Karejske hrisovulje Stefana Dušana (the Carian Charters of Stefan Dušan) from 1350, Stefan Dečanski, "Holy King 
Stefan Uroš V", decorated, fortified, and donated the temple.

In 1348, Tsar Dušan ordered aid to this monastery: the town of Dubrovnik set aside 500 perpers a year in the name of customs for the sale of salt to Serbia, the monastery of Sveti Spas na Bojani (the Monastery of the Holy Saviour on Bojana) 100 perpers, and the Monastery of St. Nicholas at Vranjina, the island on Skadar Lake, gave the Jerusalem monastery as metoh and he was obliged to set aside half of his annual income for his needs. Also, Dubrovnik would undertake to endow the Church of the Holy Archangels in Jerusalem with revenues of 2,000 perpers from Ston on the Pelješac peninsula.

During the reign of Emperor Uroš, this monastery received 100 perpers a year from Ston. Russian monks, who did not have their own monastery in Palestine, also began to gather there.

Around 1400, the Russian Archimandrite Gretenije states that the monastery stands on the spot where God destroyed the Assyrian army of 108 thousand soldiers. Russian deacon Zosimus writes 1419-1421 that the monastery belongs to the Serbian brotherhood and that the abbot is called Paisije. For a time, this monastery was a convent of the monastery of Saint Sava the Consecrated, which the sultan confirms with a firman from 1537 on the occasion of the vineyard, as well as Sultan Muhammad III in 1601. Vasilije Posnjakov in 1558-1561 found in the monastery Serbian monks from the monastery of Saint Sava the Consecrated and mentioned that two monks went to Russia to the emperor to beg for money for the renovation of the monastery, and then to Constantinople to get permission. At the beginning of the 17th century, Jan Kutvik estimated that there were more than 100 monks in the monastery. The Serbs then ran out of money, so they sold the monastery to the Greek patriarch Theophanes in 1623.

The monastery of the Holy Archangels Michael and Gabriel was ruled by Serbian monks for about 300 years. After the collapse of the medieval Serbian state, the Serbian monastery in Jerusalem was helped by Russian rulers and boyars. From the Chrysostom of Mara Branković, the wife of Sultan Murat II and the daughter of Đurađ Branković, it can be seen that this monastery was deserted for a while in the second half of the 15th century, probably due to cholera. During the reign of Theophanes III of Jerusalem, in the 17th century, the Archangels monastery fell under Greek rule.

In 1848, the Serbian spiritual mission moved into the monastery. Serb monks came across old Serbian books which some turned out to be also old Serbian records. At a peace conference in Paris in 1920, a question was raised by Serbian delegates about our administration of Serbian shrines in Palestine.

Stories about the monastery
According to Archimandrite Porphyry of the Assumption, the head of the Russian mission in Jerusalem in the middle of the 19th century, who stayed in the monastery of the Holy Archangels and claimed that the Archangels were "the most beautiful monastery of the Holy City", that there were many icons, 40 cells and that the monastery could accept about 200 devotees. The monastery housed a dining room, a hospital, a treasury, and a "wonderful library" with Greek, Latin, and Slavic manuscripts and printed books. Today, some of the Serbian-Slavic manuscripts are in the libraries of the Kyiv Theological Academy, Moscow, St. Petersburg, the Vatican, the Orthodox Monastery of St. Catherine, and the Orthodox Greek Patriarchate in Jerusalem, where the illuminated manuscript "Adorer" of "humble Gavril Tadić" was recently found (1662).

The monastery celebrated the feast of the Holy Archangel as its glory, and that is the glory of Nemanjić. It was all made of hewn stone, as was the floor. There was next to the church, many buildings and cells of monks, a lot of water, and a large fence wall. In the 19th century, there were three honorary thrones in the temple: the middle one - dedicated to the Holy Archangels, the right one - to St. John Chrysostom, and the left one - to St. Nicholas. 

Many church dignitaries, patriarchs, monks, pious citizens went on a pilgrimage to Jerusalem and the monastery of the Archangels Michael and Gabriel. Among them, in addition to Nemanjići and other Serbian rulers were Patriarch Arsenije III Crnojević (1683), who presented the monastery with the Gospel in the Old Slavonic language, Metropolitan Mihailo of Belgrade (1883), Patriarch German (1959), and Patriarch Pavle of Serbia (1994). Many Serbian dignitaries, monks, and pious citizens still visit the monastery today.

Historian Antoninije Vučetić (1845-1931) stated that the monastery fell into disrepair due to a plague.

Monastery today

The Christian part, the Old City of Jerusalem. Left-up - St. Francisco (No. 1 - Church of Christ's Resurrection)
The Monastery of the Holy Archangels Michael and Gabriel is still located in Jerusalem, within the walls of the Old City of Jerusalem, in the Christian part, and is in a preserved condition. It is located in Sv. Francis no. 9 (Saint Francis Street No.9), in the immediate vicinity of the Church of the Holy Sepulcher (Church of the Resurrection of Christ) and the Greek Patriarchate, in the Christian part of the Old Town. In the library of the Jerusalem Patriarchate, which has recently been renovated, you can find a rich treasury of Serbian-Slavic manuscripts originating from the monastery of St. Archangels Michael and Gabriel.

The Holy Synod of the Serbian Orthodox Church sent a request to the Patriarchate of Jerusalem to return the monastery to the Serbian Orthodox Church.

References 

Monasteries in Asia
Christian monasteries in Jerusalem
Religious buildings and structures in Jerusalem